Niue does not recognize polygamous marriages by civil law nor customary law.

References 

History of Niue

Niuean culture
Niue
Society of Niue
Law of Niue